Vanguard School is a public high school located in Arlington Heights, Illinois. It is part of Township High School District 214.

References

External links 
 Official web site

Arlington Heights, Illinois
Educational institutions in the United States with year of establishment missing
Public high schools in Cook County, Illinois